
This is a list of the 40 players who earned their 2000 PGA Tour card through Q School in 1999.

Players in yellow were 2000 PGA Tour rookies.

2000 Results

*PGA Tour rookie in 2000
T = Tied 
Green background indicates the player retained his PGA Tour card for 2001 (finished inside the top 125). 
Yellow background indicates the player did not retain his PGA Tour card for 2001, but retained conditional status (finished between 126-150). 
Red background indicates the player did not retain his PGA Tour card for 2001 (finished outside the top 150).

Winners on the PGA Tour in 2000

Runners-up on the PGA Tour in 2000

See also
1999 Nike Tour graduates

References
Results
Player profiles
Money list

PGA Tour Qualifying School
PGA Tour Qualifying School Graduates
PGA Tour Qualifying School Graduates